Marcelo Luis de Almeida Carmo (born February 16, 1983 in Juiz de Fora), or simply Marcelinho, is a Brazilian right back who plays for Nova Iguaçu Futebol Clube.

Honours
Brazilian Cup: 2006

Contract
CRB (Loan) 3 May 2007 to 30 November 2007
Atletico Mineiro 2 May 2007 to 31 December 2007

External links

Brazilian footballers
América Futebol Clube (MG) players
CR Flamengo footballers
Clube Atlético Mineiro players
Clube de Regatas Brasil players
Ceará Sporting Club players
Boa Esporte Clube players
Campeonato Brasileiro Série B players
1983 births
Living people
Association football defenders
People from Juiz de Fora